Klemi Saban, (born February 17, 1980),  is a retired Israeli football defender.
Saban is mostly known for playing at Maccabi Netanya, there he played 6 years, captained the club and won over 200 caps in all club competitions.

Biography
Rahamim (Klemi) Saban was born in Netanya. His younger brother Avi is also a footballer who played in the lower divisions of Israeli football. His father played at midfield for Beitar Netanya.

Sports career
Saban began his career in Maccabi Netanya and then played for several teams – Hapoel Tel Aviv, Hapoel Petah Tikva and Maccabi Haifa- in Israel before joining Romanian club Steaua București on June 28, 2006.

Saban was signed by Steaua București in June 2006, and was set to become the first Israel to play in the Romanian Divizia A. But he ended up staying on the bench for Steaua's league opener and did not make his league debut until August 5, 2006. By then, Kobi Nachtailer had already become the first Israeli to play in the league because he started his club's (FC Vaslui) first match of the season.

His club debut came earlier though when he featured in a UEFA Champions League qualifying match against ND Gorica. Saban was responsible for Steaua's last goal of the match as he was tripped up in the penalty area and the official gave Steaua a penalty kick that sealed a 3–0 victory for them.

After one year in Romania Saban returned to Israel, to Maccabi Netanya and signed a four-year contract.

In June 2010 Saban signed a two-year contract with Maccabi Tel Aviv for a transfer fee of $180,000.

Saban was a member of the Israel team for which he won 25 caps. He also won 11 caps in the Under 21 squad. He scored his first goal on 10 September 2008 against Moldova in the World Cup 2010 qualifier.

Honours
Israeli Premier League
Winner (1): 2005–06
Runner-up (2): 2001–02, 2007–08
Toto Cup
Winner (2): 2001–02, 2004–05
Israeli Second Division
Winner (1): 1998–99
Liga I
Runner-up (1): 2006–07

See also
Sports in Israel

References

External links
 
 

1980 births
Living people
Israeli Jews
Israeli footballers
Israel international footballers
Maccabi Netanya F.C. players
Hapoel Tel Aviv F.C. players
Hapoel Petah Tikva F.C. players
Maccabi Haifa F.C. players
FC Steaua București players
Maccabi Tel Aviv F.C. players
Hapoel Be'er Sheva F.C. players
Hapoel Acre F.C. players
Footballers from Netanya
Israeli expatriate footballers
Expatriate footballers in Romania
Israeli expatriate sportspeople in Romania
Israeli Premier League players
Liga I players
Israeli football managers
Hapoel Petah Tikva F.C. managers
Israeli people of Egyptian-Jewish descent
Association football defenders